Emilio del Valle (born 26 December, 1960) is a Spanish politician and a member of the Congress of Deputies for the Vox party. He was previously Minister of the Presidency for the Government of Cantabria.

del Valle studied law at the Complutense University of Madrid and was head of the General Heritage Administration Service for the Government of Cantabria. In the 1995 regional elections in Cantabria, del Valle became Minister of the Presidency under José Joaquín Martínez Sieso's cabinet. He held this position until 1999.

In March 2019, he announced he would head the list for the Cantabria constituency for the Congress of Deputies for Vox. He was subsequently elected as a deputy in the elections of April 2019.

References 

1960 births
Living people
Members of the 13th Congress of Deputies (Spain)
Members of the 14th Congress of Deputies (Spain)
Vox (political party) politicians
People from Madrid